Cecilia Dart-Thornton is an Australian author of fantasy novels, notably the Bitterbynde Trilogy.

Dart-Thornton was educated at Monash University where she completed a Bachelor of Arts, majoring in sociology.

Published works

The Bitterbynde Trilogy

The Bitterbynde Trilogy follows the journey of a mute, amnesiac foundling through a world of beauty and peril.

               
 The Ill-Made Mute (2001)
 The Lady of the Sorrows (2002)
 The Battle of Evernight (2003)

The Crowthistle Chronicles 
A four-part epic fantasy describing the adventures that befall a cursed and gifted family.

 The Iron Tree (2005)
 The Well of Tears (2005)
 Weatherwitch (2006)
 Fallowblade (2007)

Other works

Short stories 
 Long the Clouds Are Over Me Tonight (Published in the anthology Emerald Magic: Great Tales of Irish Fantasy; Tor Books, 2004)
 The Stolen Swanmaiden (Published in Australian Women's Weekly, September 2005)
 The Lanes of Camberwell (Published by HarperCollins in the anthology Dreaming Again, 2008)
 The Enchanted (Published by HarperCollins in the anthology Legends of Australian Fantasy, 2010)

References

External links
 
Bibliography at Fantastic Fiction

 

Living people
Australian fantasy writers
Writers from Melbourne
Australian women novelists
20th-century Australian novelists
Women science fiction and fantasy writers
20th-century Australian women writers
1961 births